The American Banjo Museum Hall of Fame, formerly known as the National Four-String Banjo Hall of Fame, recognizes musicians. bands, or companies that have made a distinct contribution to banjo performance, education, manufacturing, and towards promotion of the banjo. The hall of fame is a part of the American Banjo Museum located in Oklahoma City, Oklahoma.

When the National Four-String Banjo Hall of Fame Museum became the American Banjo Museum in 2009, its focus began to shift to be more inclusive of all banjos. Originally focusing on four-string banjo players, the hall of fame expanded in 2013 to recognize contributions from 5-string banjo players as well, allowing them to be recognized in "non-performance categories" and creating a category specific to 5-string banjo players. The first 5-string banjoists were added to the hall of fame beginning in 2014.

Inductees into the American Banjo Museum Hall of Fame in 2018 include Bela Fleck (5-string performance), Borgy Borgerson (4-string performance), Jim Henson (promotion), Hub Nitsche and the Banjo Newsletter (both instruction and education), and Eddie Collins (historical). The 2019 inductees include Alison Brown (five-string performance), Johnny Baier (4-string performance), Jimmy Mazzy (4-string performance), John Hartford (historical), Bob Snow (promotion), and Janet Davis (instruction and education).

5-String Performance

2014 - Earl Scruggs
2015 - Pete Seeger
2016 - J.D. Crowe
2017 - John McEuen
2018 - Bela Fleck
2019 - Alison Brown

4-String Performance

1998 - Marvin "Smokey" Montgomery / C. Sandy Riner
1999 - Eddie Peabody / Harry Reser
2000 - Don Van Palta / Perry Bechtel
2001 - Buddy Wachter / Roy Smeck
2002 - Tim Allan / Johnny St. Cyr
2003 - Cathy Reilly Finn / Scotty Plummer
2004 - Al Smith / Freddy Morgan
2005 - Doug Mattocks / Michael Pingitore
2006 - Cynthia Sayer / Pat Terry, Sr.
2007 - Georgette Twain / John Cali
2008 - Jad Paul / Maurice Bolyer
2009 - John Becker / Buck Kelly
2010 - Dave Marty / Helen Baker
2011 - Greg Allen / Gene Sheldon
2012 - Lee Floyd III / Skip DeVol
2013 - Mike Gentry / Eddie Connors
2014 - Debbie Schreyer / Elmer Snowden
2015 - Eddy Davis
2016 - Pat Terry, Jr.
2017 - Paul Erikson
2018 - Borgy Borgerson
2019 - Johnny Baier / Jimmy Mazzy

Historical

2016 - George Formby
2017 - Joel Walker Sweeney
2018 - Eddie Collins
2019 - John Hartford

Instruction & Education

2001 - Mel Bay
2002 - Lowell Schreyer
2003 - Charlie Tagawa
2004 - Charles McNeil
2005 - Buddy Griffin
2006 - Walter Kaye Bauer
2007 - Don Van Palta
2008 - Don Stevison
2009 - Dave Frey
2010 - Jim Riley
2011 - Daryl Whiting
2012 - Buddy Wachter
2013 - Steve Caddick
2014 - Mike Currao
2015 - Tim Allan
2016 - Alfred Greathouse
2017 - Tony Trischka
2018 - Hub Nitsche & Banjo Newsletter
2019 - Janet Davis

Design & Manufacture

2003 - C.C. Richelieu
2004 - Fred Bacon & Daniel Day
2005 - Renee Karnes
2006 - Gibson Mandolin-Guitar Mfg. Co, Ltd. & Gibson Instrument Company
2007 - Wm. Lange/Paramount
2008 - Dale Small
2009 - Henry Lea
2010 - Chuck Ogsbury/OME
2011 - Vega
2012 - Jim Farquhar
2013 - Wayne Fairchild
2014 - David L. Day
2015 - Albert D. Grover
2016 - Deering Banjos

Promotion

2000 - Sherwood "Shakey" Johnson
2001 - Frank Rossi
2001 - Jack Canine
2002 - Jubilee Banjo Band
2003 - Ralph Martin
2004 - Fred "Mickey" Finn
2005 - Joel Schiavone
2006 - Eddy Davis
2007 - Walt Disney Company
2008 - Jack Dupen, Harry Higgins (album The Red Garter)
2009 - Myron Hinkle
2010 - Bill Pincumbe
2011 - Horis Ward
2012 - Glenn Parks 
2013 - Somethin' Smith and the Redheads
2014 - The Kingston Trio
2015 - Steve Martin
2017 - Roy Clark
2018 - Jim Henson
2019 - Bob Snow (started Rosie O'Grady's Good Time Emporium)

See also
List of banjo players
List of museums in Oklahoma

References

National Four-String Banjo Hall of Fame members
Lists of musicians by instrument
Music hall of fame inductees
Halls of fame in Oklahoma
Museums in Oklahoma City
Awards established in 1998
Banjo family instruments